The Craftsman, also known as The Country Journal or, The Craftsman or The Craftsman: Being a Critique on the Times, was a British newspaper which operated from 1726 to 1752.  Established by Lord Bolingbroke and William Pulteney, it was edited by Nicholas Amhurst under the pseudonym "Caleb D'Anvers". It is known for publishing letters and essays from Lord Bolingbroke.

References

External links
The Craftsman archives at HathiTrust

Defunct newspapers published in the United Kingdom
Publications established in 1726
Publications disestablished in 1752